Ashraf Dehghani (born 1949) is amongst the best known Iranian female communist revolutionaries, and is a member of the Iranian People's Fedai Guerrillas.

Biography
Deghani was born in Azarbaijan province in 1949. In 1971 at age 22 Ashraf Dehghani (then a member of the Organization of Iranian People's Fedai Guerrillas (OIPFG) cadre) was arrested, imprisoned, and tortured for her political beliefs under the rule of the Shah of Iran, Mohammed Reza Pahlavi. Her memoirs, entitled Torture and Resistance in Iran, document the events prior to and during her imprisonment. The memoirs provide not only a detailed personal account of Ashraf Dehghani's inner struggles while in prison, but also a description of the broader political struggles and objective conditions required for any revolutionary party to survive outside and inside of prison.

In 1973, she, together with Nahid Jalali, a member of MKO, organized a successful escape from prison. Ashraf Dehghani wrote her memoirs after escaping the Shah's prison in Iran, near the end of 1971. During her years of underground activity, at some point she worked directly with the OIPFG leader Hamid Ashraf.  Later she fled abroad where she directed the international relations of the organization.

In 1979, she led a split away from OIPFG, and formed the Iranian People's Fedai Guerrillas. The dispute with the leadership of the OIPFG stemmed from Ashraf's unwavering loyalty to Masoud Ahmadzadeh's theories. She also accused the leadership of deviating from Fadai's revolutionary traditions and inclination to compromise with the government. After a war between Kurds and Iranian Islamic Republic in 1981, a Kurdish revolutionary group of Ashraf Dehghani's group was formed.

References

External links

 The Iranian People's Fadaee Guerrillas
 Ashraf Dehghani's Website
 Part One of Torture and Resistance in Iran
 Part Two of Torture and Resistance in Iran

1949 births
Iranian communists
People of the Iranian Revolution
Iranian revolutionaries
20th-century Iranian women politicians
Organization of Iranian People's Fedai Guerrillas members
Escapees from Iranian detention
Iranian atheists
20th-century atheists
21st-century atheists
Living people